Girls in White is a 1936 German musical comedy film directed by Victor Janson and starring Maria Cebotari, Iván Petrovich and Hilde von Stolz. It was shot at the Terra Studios in Berlin. The film's sets were designed by the art director

Set in pre-revolutionary Russia at the Smolny Institute, the film tells the story of the young student Daniela, who wants to follow in her mother's footsteps and become an opera singer. The film's most famous song is "I am Here to be Happy" ("Ich bin auf der Welt glücklich zu sein").

Cast
 Maria Cebotari as Daniela
 Iván Petrovich as Count Feodor Ivanowitsch Schuwalow
 Hilde von Stolz as Natalia (a dancer)
 Georg Alexander as Grand Duke Sergej Andrejewitsch
 Ernst Dumcke as Opera Director
 Hans Junkermann as General Goremkin (Daniela's uncle)
 Ilse Fürstenberg as Irina (General Goremkin's wife)
 Herta Worell as Vera (schoolgirl)
 Trude Haefelin as Olga (schoolgirl)
 Rosette Zobber as Marina (schoolgirl)
 Eduard Wenck as Marignano (conductor)
 Norberto Ardelli as Cavallini (a famous tenor)
 Margarete Schön as Maria Petrowna
 Blandine Ebinger as Lydia Antonowana (nursery school teacher)
 Änne von Elms as Gilda in the opera Rigoletto

Criticism 
Contemporary American critics complimented Cebotari's work in the "operatic film." Variety noted that it was "not exactly a second 'Mädchen in Uniform' for world consumption," but praised Cebotari's performance.

References

Bibliography
 Klaus, Ulrich J. Deutsche Tonfilme: Jahrgang 1936. Klaus-Archiv, 1988.

External links 
 

1936 films
1936 musical comedy films
Films of Nazi Germany
German musical comedy films
1930s German-language films
Films directed by Victor Janson
German black-and-white films
1930s German films
Films shot at Terra Studios